{{DISPLAYTITLE:C3H2F6O}}
The molecular formula C3H2F6O (molar mass: 168.038 g/mol, exact mass: 168.0010 u) may refer to:

 Desflurane
 Hexafluoro-2-propanol (HFIP)